Daniel Allen Butler (born January 24, 1957) is an American author and playwright, who writes on historical topics, particularly maritime history.  The Washington Times described him as a "steamship nut".

Education
Butler was educated at Hope College, Grand Valley State University, and the University of Erlangen.

Publications
 Unsinkable: The Full Story of RMS Titanic. Stackpole Books, 1998,  . The book was a New York Times bestseller, and was described by The Washington Post as "the best narrative" of the Titanic story
 The Lusitania: The Life, Loss, and Legacy of an Ocean Legend.  Stackpole Books, 2000,  
 Warrior Queens: The Queen Mary and Queen Elizabeth in World War II. Stackpole Books, 2002,  
 The Age of Cunard: A Transatlantic History 1839–2003. Lighthouse Press, 2003,	 
 Distant Victory: The Battle of Jutland and the Allied Triumph in the First World War. Praeger Security International, 2006,  
 The First Jihad: The Battle for Khartoum, and the Dawn of Militant Islam. Casemate, 2007,  
 The Other Side of the Night: The Carpathia, the Californian and the Night the Titanic was Lost. Casemate, 2009,  
 The Burden of Guilt: How Germany Shattered the Last Days of Peace, August 1914. Casemate, 2010,

References

1957 births
Living people
American military writers
Place of birth missing (living people)
American maritime historians
21st-century American historians
American male non-fiction writers
20th-century American historians
20th-century American male writers
21st-century American male writers
Hope College alumni
Grand Valley State University alumni
University of Erlangen-Nuremberg alumni